Yury Sergeyevich Shavrin (25 September 1924 – 11 April 1974) was a Russian sailor who competed at the 1956 and 1964 Summer Olympics. In 1956 he placed 12th in the Finn class, and in 1964 finished 9th in the mixed three-person keelboat. Domestically Shavrin won 8 titles in different categories between 1947 and 1968.

References

1924 births
1974 deaths
Soviet male sailors (sport)
Russian male sailors (sport)
Olympic sailors of the Soviet Union
Sailors at the 1956 Summer Olympics – Finn
Sailors at the 1964 Summer Olympics – Dragon